Mirakel Musik is a netlabel, based in Sweden, releasing  experimental music in genres such as ambient, electronica, industrial, and noise, (not idm, techno). All releases are under Creative Commons. The label's artists include Maurizio Bianchi and Erratic.

External links
 Catalogue at Discogs
 Catalogue entry at Archive.org

Electronic music record labels
Indie rock record labels
Swedish record labels
Netlabels
Record labels established in 1998
Ambient music record labels
Online music stores of Sweden